This is a round-up of the 1997 Sligo Senior Football Championship. Tourlestrane reclaimed the title in this year, their fifth in all, following an emphatic victory over a disappointing Eastern Harps side.

First round

Quarter finals

Semi-finals

Sligo Senior Football Championship Final

References

 Sligo Champion (July–September 1997)

Sligo Senior Football Championship
Sligo Senior Football Championship